
Year 411 (CDXI) was a common year starting on Sunday (link will display the full calendar) of the Julian calendar. At the time, it was known as the Year of the Consulship of Theodosius without colleague (or, less frequently, year 1164 Ab urbe condita). The denomination 411 for this year has been used since the early medieval period, when the Anno Domini calendar era became the prevalent method in Europe for naming years.

Events 
 By place 
 Roman Empire 
 Emperor Honorius sends two Roman generals to deal with the usurper Constantine III in Gaul. They kill Gerontius, Constantine's rebellious general (magister militum) in Spain, then besiege Arles and defeat Constantine III. He is taken prisoner and put to death at Ravenna.
 Following the defeat of Constantine III, the Burgundians and the Gallic nobility proclaim Jovinus, Gallo-Roman senator, emperor of the Western Roman Empire at Mogontiacum (modern Mainz).

 Europe 
 King Ataulf leads the Goths into Gaul at the instigation of Honorius, who promises to recognise a Visigothic Kingdom if he defeats the several usurpers who threaten the Roman Empire.
 The Alans establish their rule in the Roman province of Lusitania (Portugal south of the Duero River and Spain). 
 The Teutonic tribes in Spain join the Roman Empire as foederati (allies with military commitments).

 Asia 
 Ingyo succeeds his brother Hanzei, and becomes the 19th emperor of Japan.

 By topic 
 Religion 
 Rabbula becomes bishop of Edessa.
 The Councils of Carthage are held, on the issue of Donatism.

Births 
Merovech, Founder of the Merovingian Dynasty and grandfather of Clovis I (approximate date)

Deaths 
 September 18 – Constantine III, Roman usurper 
 Constans II, usurper and son of Constantine III
 Gerontius, Roman general
 Gundomar I, king of Burgundy
 Yax Nuun Ayiin I, king of Tikal (Guatemala) (approximate date)

References